Today We Kill... Tomorrow We Die!  also known as Today It's Me... Tomorrow You!, is a 1968 Spaghetti Western film. It is the directorial debut of Tonino Cervi, who co-wrote the film with Dario Argento.

Plot
Wrongfully convicted Bill Kiowa spends his sentence planning revenge against the gang of Comancheros who murdered his wife and arranged for his blame.  Upon his release he hires four specialist killers for his vengeance.

Cast 
 Montgomery Ford as Bill Kiowa 
 Bud Spencer as O'Bannion
 Wayde Preston as Jeff Milton
 William Berger as Francis "Colt" Moran
 Tatsuya Nakadai as James Elfego
 Jeff Cameron as Moreno
 Stanley Gordon as Bunny Fox
 Diana Madigan as Mirana Kiowa
 Doro Corra' as Gun Seller
 Aldo Marianecci as Peter, the Barber 
 Michele Borelli as Sheriff Bannister 
 Umberto Di Grazia as Elfego's Henchman
 Franco Pechini as Prison Warden

Release
Today We Kill...Tomorrow We Die! was released in March 1968.

References

Bibliography

External links

1968 films
Films directed by Tonino Cervi
Spaghetti Western films
1968 Western (genre) films
Films with screenplays by Dario Argento
Films scored by Angelo Francesco Lavagnino
1968 directorial debut films
1960s Italian-language films
1960s Italian films